Ya'bad is a Palestinian town in the northern West Bank, 20 kilometers west of Jenin in the Jenin Governorate. It is a major agricultural town with most of its land covered with olive groves and grain fields. According to the Palestinian Central Bureau of Statistics, the town had a population of 13,640 in 2007. Its mayor is Samer Abu Baker who was elected in 2005. The Israeli settlement of Mevo Dotan is built on Ya'bad's land.

History
Pottery sherds from the Persian, Hellenistic, early Roman, Byzantine, early Muslim and the Medieval eras have been found here.

Ottoman era
In 1596 Ya'bad appeared in the Ottoman tax registers as being in the nahiya of Jabal Sami in the liwa of Nablus. It had a population of 62 households, all Muslim. They paid a tax rate of 33.3% on agricultural products, including wheat, barley, summer crops, occasional revenues, goats and beehives, and a press for olives or grapes; a total of 18,085 akçe. Half of the revenue went to a waqf  dedicated to Halil ar-Rahman. In 1694, Abd al-Ghani al-Nabulsi, a Muslim traveler, passed by Ya'bad and noted it as "a village between Jenin and Arrabeh".

In the 17th-18th centuries, Ya'bad was well known for producing the best cheese in Jabal Nablus. Politically it was ruled by the Qadri clan allied with the powerful Abd al-Hadi clan.  In 1838, it was noted as a Muslim village, Ya'bud, located in the  esh–Sha'rawiyeh esh–Shurkiyeh District.

In 1870 Victor Guérin noted Ya'bad situated "on a hill", while in the PEF's Survey of Western Palestine  (1882), Yabid was described as "a good-sized stone village, with some Christian families and two factions of Moslems, called respectively the 'Abd el Hady and the Beni Tokan, living in separate quarters. The village stands on a ridge, with a well to the south and a small separate quarter on the east, in which is a small Mukam."

British Mandate era
In the 1922 census of Palestine, conducted by the British Mandate authorities, Yabid had a population of 1,733, all Muslims, increasing in the 1931 census to a population of 2,383, still all Muslim, in 418 occupied houses.

In 1935 the prominent Arab resistance leader Izz ad-Din al-Qassam and a few of his men were killed in a cave near Ya'bad during a firefight with the British.

In the 1945 statistics the population of Ya'bad (including Khirbat el Khuljan, Khirbat et Tarim, Khirbat Tura ash Sharqiya, Nazlat Sheik Zeid and Khirbat Umm Rihan) was 3,480, all Muslims,  with 37,805 dunams of land, according to an official land and population survey. 6,035 dunams were used for plantations and irrigable land, 9,955 dunams for cereals, while 92 dunams were built-up (urban) land.

Jordanian era
In the wake of the 1948 Arab–Israeli War, and after the 1949 Armistice Agreements, Ya’bad came under Jordanian rule.

The Jordanian census of 1961 found 4,709 inhabitants in Ya'bad.

Post-1967
Since the 1967 Six-Day War, Ya'bad has been under Israeli occupation. The population of Ya'bad in the 1967 census conducted by Israel was 4,857, of whom 581 originated from the Israeli territory.

In May 1985 five village women set up a Women's Work Committee which opened a kindergarten for 60 children and started a sewing course with 32 young women.

A major charcoal mine is located near Ya'bad and most of its workers come from the town. Since the establishment of "closed-off areas" and the construction of the West Bank Barrier in the northern West Bank, Ya'bad and surrounding cities and towns have seen an increase in unemployment which reached to 88% in 2006. The annual average income has dropped "dramatically" by one-third according to the World Bank.

See also 
List of cities in Palestinian Authority areas

References

Bibliography

External links
Welcome To Ya'bad
 Yabad, Welcome to Palestine
Survey of Western Palestine, Map 8:   IAA, Wikimedia commons 
The Israeli Checkpoints in the Northern Districts of the West Bank 24, August, 2003, POICA
  Hundreds of dunums confiscated for bypass road construction 07, May, 2007,  POICA
 Confiscating a Truck in Ya'bad Village - Jenin Governorate 06, November, 2011,  POICA

Jenin Governorate
Cities in the West Bank
Municipalities of the State of Palestine